Rhododendron adenogynum (腺房杜鹃) is a species of flowering plant in the heath family Ericaceae, native to southwest Sichuan, southeast Xizang, and northwest Yunnan in China, where it grows at altitudes of . The flowers are white to pink, with crimson spots.

Though hardy, it is rarely seen in cultivation outside of specialist collections.

References

External links
 "Rhododendron adenogynum", Diels, Notes Roy. Bot. Gard. Edinburgh. 5: 216. 1912.
 Hirsutum.com
 Danish Soc of ARS

adenogynum